A Sano shunt is a shunt from the right ventricle to the pulmonary circulation.

In contrast to a Blalock–Taussig shunt, circulation is primarily in systole.

It is sometimes used as the first step in a Norwood procedure.

This procedure was pioneered by the Japanese Cardiothoracic Surgeon, Shunji Sano (b.1953) in 2003.

References

Cardiac surgery